In classical mechanics, Appell's equation of motion (aka the Gibbs–Appell equation of motion) is an alternative general formulation of classical mechanics described by  Josiah Willard Gibbs in 1879 and Paul Émile Appell in 1900.

Statement 
The Gibbs-Appell equation reads

The generalized force gives the work done

where the index  runs over the  generalized coordinates , which usually correspond to the degrees of freedom of the system.  The function  is defined as the mass-weighted sum of the particle accelerations squared,

where the index  runs over the  particles, and

is the acceleration of the -th particle, the second time derivative of its position vector .

Relations to other formulations of classical mechanics 
Appell's formulation does not introduce any new physics to classical mechanics and as such is equivalent to other reformulations of classical mechanics, such as Lagrangian mechanics, and Hamiltonian mechanics. All classical mechanics is contained within Newton's laws of motion. In some cases, Appell's equation of motion may be more convenient than the commonly used Lagrangian mechanics, particularly when nonholonomic constraints are involved. In fact, Appell's equation leads directly to Lagrange's equations of motion. Moreover, it can be used to derive Kane's equations, which are particularly suited for describing the motion of complex spacecraft. Appell's formulation is an application of Gauss' principle of least constraint.

Derivation

The change in the particle positions rk for an infinitesimal change in the D generalized coordinates is

Taking two derivatives with respect to time yields an equivalent equation for the accelerations

The work done by an infinitesimal change dqr in the generalized coordinates is

where Newton's second law for the kth particle

has been used. Substituting the formula for drk and swapping the order of the two summations yields the formulae

Therefore, the generalized forces are

This equals the derivative of S with respect to the generalized accelerations

yielding Appell's equation of motion

Examples

Euler's equations of rigid body dynamics

Euler's equations provide an excellent illustration of Appell's formulation.
 
Consider a rigid body of N particles joined by rigid rods.  The rotation of the body may be described by an angular velocity vector , and the corresponding angular acceleration vector

The velocity of the -th particle is given by

where  is the particle's position in Cartesian coordinates; its corresponding acceleration is

Therefore, the function  may be written as

Setting the derivative of S with respect to  equal to the torque yields Euler's equations

See also

 Principle of stationary action
 Analytical mechanics

References

Further reading
 
 
 
  Connection of Appell's formulation with the principle of least action.
 PDF copy of Appell's article at Goettingen University 
 PDF copy of a second article on Appell's equations and Gauss's principle

Classical mechanics